The Smuggler is a 1911 American silent short romantic drama. The film starred William Garwood Florence La Badie and Harry Benham.

Cast
 William Garwood as The Smuggler
 Florence La Badie as The Smuggler's wife
 Harry Benham as The Secret Service Man

External links
 

1911 romantic drama films
1911 films
Thanhouser Company films
American romantic drama films
American silent short films
American black-and-white films
1911 short films
1910s American films
Silent romantic drama films
Silent American drama films